The members of the 16th Manitoba Legislature were elected in the Manitoba general election held in June 1920. The legislature sat from February 10, 1921, to June 24, 1922.

The Liberal Party led by Tobias Norris formed a minority government.

John Thomas Haig of the Conservatives was Leader of the Opposition.

James Bryson Baird served as speaker for the assembly.

There were two sessions of the 16th Legislature:

James Albert Manning Aikins was Lieutenant Governor of Manitoba.

Members of the Assembly 
The following members were elected to the assembly in 1920:

Notes:

By-elections 
By-elections were held to replace members for various reasons:

Notes:

References 

Terms of the Manitoba Legislature
1921 establishments in Manitoba
1922 disestablishments in Manitoba